Lubuski may refer to:
 coming from Lubusz Voivodeship / Lubusz Land
 Ser Lubuski, typ of cheese: List of Polish cheeses
 Podpiwek Lubuski, Polish non-alcoholic beverage
 Gin Lubuski, gin by Henkell & Co. Sektkellerei
 Mieszko Lubuski (1223/27 – 1242), a member of the Silesian Piasts, was Duke of Lubusz
 Toruń Lubuski, small town in Sulęcin County, Lubusz Voivodeship, now as Torzym
 Stadion Lubuski, name for Stadion SOSiR (Słubice)